The National Center for Electron Microscopy (NCEM) was a U.S. Department of Energy national user facility at Lawrence Berkeley National Laboratory in Berkeley, California, for unclassified scientific research using advanced electron microscopy. It has since been merged with the Molecular Foundry, also located at Berkeley Lab.

External links
 Official National Center for Electron Microscopy website

Lawrence Berkeley National Laboratory
United States Department of Energy national laboratories
Laboratories in California
University and college laboratories in the United States
Research institutes in the San Francisco Bay Area